Freckles is a lost 1917 American drama silent film directed by Marshall Neilan and written by Gene Stratton-Porter and Marion Fairfax. The film stars Jack Pickford, Louise Huff, Hobart Bosworth, Lillian Leighton, William Elmer and Guy Oliver. The film was released on May 28, 1917, by Paramount Pictures.

Plot

Cast 
Jack Pickford as Freckles
Louise Huff as Angel
Hobart Bosworth as John McLean
Lillian Leighton as Bird Woman
William Elmer as Black Jack
Guy Oliver as Duncan

References

External links 
 

1917 films
1910s English-language films
Silent American drama films
1917 drama films
Paramount Pictures films
Films directed by Marshall Neilan
American black-and-white films
American silent feature films
Films based on works by Gene Stratton-Porter
Films based on American novels
Films about lumberjacks
1910s American films